George Witty (1856 – 21 November 1941) was a New Zealand Member of Parliament for Riccarton, in the South Island.

Early life
He was born in North Ferriby, in the East Riding of Yorkshire, England and came to New Zealand in 1875 with two shillings in his pocket. He was a farmer and a director of the local saleyards company in Christchurch.

Member of Parliament

George Witty represented the Riccarton electorate in the New Zealand House of Representatives for twenty three years from 1902 to 1925 . Witty was a Liberal but at the 1922 election he stood as an Independent and was successful. 

Witty was a member of the Legislative Council from 1925 to 28 October 1932. Witty and Leonard Isitt were both appointed to the Legislative Council by Gordon Coates on 28 October 1925; shortly before the 1925 election on 4 November. Both were Liberals but their retirement removed "a source of some bitterness from the Party’s ranks (Coates rewarded them with seats in the Legislative Council the day after the election)". Gordon Coates was Reform, and both of their former seats went to Reform candidates.

After Witty, Bert Kyle of the Reform Party represented the Riccarton electorate.

In 1935, Witty was awarded the King George V Silver Jubilee Medal. He received the King George VI Coronation Medal in 1937, and served as chairman of the Paparua County Council.

Death
Witty died in Christchurch on 21 November 1941, aged 85 years.

External links

References

1856 births
1941 deaths
New Zealand Liberal Party MPs
Independent MPs of New Zealand
Members of the New Zealand Legislative Council
Mayors of places in Canterbury, New Zealand
New Zealand farmers
New Zealand businesspeople
New Zealand people of English descent
People from North Ferriby
New Zealand MPs for Christchurch electorates
Local politicians in New Zealand
Members of the New Zealand House of Representatives